KLH Vajgar Jindřichův Hradec is an ice hockey team in Jindřichův Hradec, Czech Republic. They play in the Czech 2.liga, the third level of ice hockey in the Czech Republic.

History
The club was founded as SRC Vajgar Jindřichův Hradec in 1929. They were known as TJ Slovan Jindřichův Hradec from 1950 to 2006. In 2006, they changed their name to KLH Vajgar Jindřichův Hradec.

Achievements
Czech 1.liga champion: 1993.
Czech 2.liga champion: 1989, 2003, 2004, 2005.
Promoted to the Czech 1.liga: 2005.

External links
Official site

Ice hockey teams in the Czech Republic
Sport in Jindřichův Hradec